Mouchid Iyane Ly (born December 28, 1986, Saint-Louis, Senegal) is a professional Senegalese football player, who currently plays for Al-Ittihad.

Career
Ly began his career with Espoir Saint Louis and joined 2007 to city rival ASC Linguère. After three years with ASC Linguère in the Senegal Premier League was in January 2009 loaned out to Shenzhen Shangqingyin.

International career
He was a member of Senegal national football team for 2009 African Championship of Nations.

References

1986 births
Living people
Senegalese footballers
Senegalese expatriate footballers
Expatriate footballers in Syria
Expatriate footballers in China
Al-Ittihad Aleppo players
Shenzhen F.C. players
Senegalese expatriate sportspeople in China
Chinese Super League players
ASC Linguère players
Association football forwards
Sportspeople from Saint-Louis, Senegal
AFC Cup winning players
Syrian Premier League players
2009 African Nations Championship players
Senegal A' international footballers